Hantam is an administrative area in the Namakwa District of Northern Cape in South Africa.

Hatam is a Khoi name that means "mountains where the bulbs grow". The municipality is named after the Hantam Mountains found in the area.

Main places
The 2011 census divided the municipality into the following main places:

Finances
In the 2018/19 financial year, 78% of the council's expenditure was deemed unauthorised, irregular, fruitless and wasteful, down from 95% the previous year. At the end of the 2019 year, the council had a cash balance to cover its operating costs for ten days.

Politics

The municipal council consists of thirteen members elected by mixed-member proportional representation. Seven councillors are elected by first-past-the-post voting in seven wards, while the remaining six are chosen from party lists so that the total number of party representatives is proportional to the number of votes received. In the election of 1 November 2021 no party obtained a majority of seats on the council. The following table shows the results of the election.

References

External links
 

Local municipalities of the Namakwa District Municipality